Ajita Kesakambali was an ancient Indian philosopher in the 6th century BC. He is considered to be the first known proponent of Indian materialism, and forerunner to the Charvaka school. He was probably a contemporary of the Buddha and Mahavira. It has frequently been noted that the doctrines of the Lokayata school were considerably drawn from Ajita's teachings.

Philosophy

Like those of Lokayatins, nothing survives of Ajita's teachings in script, except some scattered references made by his opponents for the sake of refutation. Thus, due to the nature of these references, the basic framework of his philosophy has to be derived by filtering out obscure legends associated with him.

From Buddhist sources
According to a Buddhist legend Ajita wore a blanket of human hair (Kesakambali in Sanskrit means "with the hair blanket"), "which is described as being the most miserable garment. It was cold in cold weather, and hot in the hot, foul smelling and uncouth". Ajita means "unconquered", which implies that he was very argumentative.

According to an early Buddhist sources,  Ajita Kesakambali argued that:
There is no such thing as alms or sacrifice or offering. There is neither fruit nor result of good or evil deeds. A human being is built up of four elements. When he dies the earthly in him returns and relapses to the earth, the fluid to the water, the heat to the fire, the wind to the air, and his faculties pass into space. The four bearers, on the bier as a fifth, take his dead body away; till they reach the burning ground, men utter forth eulogies, but there his bones are bleached, and his offerings end in ashes. It is a doctrine of fools, this talk of gifts. It is an empty lie, mere idle talk, when men say there is profit herein. Fools and wise alike, on the dissolution of the body, are cut off, annihilated, and after death they are not.

According to the Brahmajala Sutta, Ajita propounded Ucchedavada (the Doctrine of Annihilation after death) and Tam-Jivam-tam-sariram-vada (the doctrine of identity of the soul and body), which denied the separate existence of an eternal soul. The extent to which these doctrines, which were evidently inherited by Lokayata, were found contemptible and necessary to be refuted in the idealist, theist and religious literature of the time is a possible evidence of their popularity and, perhaps also, their philosophical sophistication.

Modern interpretations
D. D. Kosambi, who elsewhere calls Ajita a proto-materialist, notes that he "preached a thoroughgoing materialist doctrine: good deeds and charity gained a man nothing in the end. His body dissolved into the primary elements at death, no matter what he had or had not done. Nothing remained. Good and evil, charity and compassion were all irrelevant to a man's fate."

See also
 Ajivika
 Ajñana
 Makkhali Gosala
 Pakudha Kaccayana
 Purana Kassapa
 Shramana

Notes

References
 Bhaskar, Bhagchandra Jain, Jainism in Buddhist Literature (Alok Prakashan, Nagpur, 1972)
 Chattopadhyaya, Debiprasad, Indian Philosophy (People's Publishing House, New Delhi, 1964, 7th Edition: 1993)
 Kosambi, DD, An Introduction to the Study of Indian History (Popular Prakashan, Mumbai, India, 1956)
 Kosambi, DD, The Culture and Civilisation of Ancient India in Historical Outline (Routledge & Kegan Paul, London, 1965)
 Ñāṇamoli, Bhikkhu (trans.) and Bodhi, Bhikkhu (ed.), The Middle-Length Discourses of the Buddha: A Translation of the Majjhima Nikāya (Wisdom Publications, Boston, 2001) .
 Thanissaro Bhikkhu (trans.) Samaññaphala Sutta: The Fruits of the Contemplative Life (DN 2) (1997) Available on-line at http://www.accesstoinsight.org/tipitaka/dn/dn.02.0.than.html.
 Walshe, Maurice O'Connell (trans.), The Long Discourses of the Buddha: A Translation of the Dīgha Nikāya (Wisdom Publications, Somerville, MA, 1995) .

6th-century BC Indian philosophers
Atheist philosophers
Indian materialists